Dunbar Elementary School is a former elementary school for African-American students in Hobe Sound, Florida. It was part of the Martin County School District and was named for African-American author Paul Laurence Dunbar. It closed in 1969. One factor is that it was too small and the site not appropriate for expansion.

References

Historically segregated African-American schools in Florida
Public elementary schools in Florida
Martin County School District
Defunct public schools in Martin County, Florida
1969 disestablishments in Florida
Defunct black public schools in the United States that closed when schools were integrated
Educational institutions disestablished in 1969
Historically black schools
Buildings and structures in Martin County, Florida